Mendlesham is a village in Suffolk with 1,407 inhabitants at the 2011 census.

The place-name 'Mendlesham' is first attested in the Domesday Book of 1086, where it appears as Melnesham and Mundlesham. The name means 'Myndel's village'.

Mendlesham is known for its large street fair which is held on every May Day bank holiday. Mendlesham has a popular community newsletter, and a good primary school. There is one public house in the village called 'The King's Head'. The village has a fish and chip shop and Mendlesham Bakery, a 'Premier Stores' convenience store with a Post Office counter..

The mast stands at the corner of the former WWII airfield, RAF Mendlesham. This was used by the RAF and US Eighth Air Force between 1943 and 1955, and once held a memorial to the US 34th Bomb Group. The memorial has now been moved to the churchyard of St. Mary's in Mendlesham. Although some of the land has reverted to agriculture or is an industrial estate, one airstrip is now used by the Suffolk Coastal Floaters Hang Gliding Club.

There are two churches in the village, a small URC chapel and the grand medieval church of St Mary the Virgin, built at a time when the village had a much larger population, as well as a Baptist chapel in Mendlesham Green.  Unlike many Anglican churches today, there is a mass (Communion) service held every day at St Mary's.

In 1531  , the Mendlesham Christian Brethren were a group of Protestant dissenters, and two decades later, Adam Foster became a Marian martyr, after he refused to attend a Roman Catholic mass. He was condemned to be burnt at the stake   by John Hopton, the Bishop of Norwich.

Mendlesham had the second station on the Mid-Suffolk Light Railway, which ran from 1904 to 1952.

Mendlesham Manor is an Elizabethan Manor House.

Close to Mendlesham is the hamlet of Mendlesham Green, which contains Mendlesham Green Baptist Church.

The village was struck by an F0/T1 tornado on 23 November 1981, as part of the record-breaking nationwide tornado outbreak on that day.

See also 
Foxe's Book of Martyrs

References

External links

Mendlesham Parish Council - Mendlesham's official website
Simon's Suffolk churches - Mendlesham
St Mary the Virgin Mendlesham

Villages in Suffolk
Mid Suffolk District
Civil parishes in Suffolk